The 2012 GP Ouest-France was the 76th edition of the GP Ouest-France, a single-day cycling race. It was the twenty-fourth race of the 2012 UCI World Tour season.

Costa managed to hold off the rest of the field for second place, while the bunch sprint for third place was taken by 's Heinrich Haussler.

Teams
As the GP Ouest-France was a UCI World Tour event, all 18 UCI ProTeams were invited automatically and obligated to send a squad. Five other squads were given wildcard places into the race, and as such, formed the event's 23-team peloton.

The 23 teams that competed in the race were:

Results

References

External links

GP Ouest-France
GP Ouest-France
Bretagne Classic